That's Hockey 2Nite was a Canadian television series on TSN which presents the latest news in hockey as well as panelists and interviews with hockey personalities. The current host is Steve Kouleas serves as the program's host and Matthew Barnaby, among others, serve as analysts.

The show usually airs following the game at 9:30pm ET on the main network. 

The show debuted February 1, 2011 on TSN2. The show ends with a segment called "The Good, The Bad and The Ugly".

See also
 That's Hockey

External links 
 That's Hockey 2Nite

References

2010s Canadian sports television series
National Hockey League on television
The Sports Network original programming